One Day in the Future is a 2010 Turkish comedy film, directed by Boğaçhan Dündar, featuring Hayrettin Karaoğuz as a man who is shown his unrealised future by two angels after committing suicide.

Plot
Tolga (Hayrettin Karaoğuz), having struggled with bad luck all his life, believes he is a total loser and the unluckiest man in the whole world. Following an unsuccessful presentation of his new project at work, he is fired. Believing he has ruined his last chance to win over the love of his life (Hande Subaşı), he commits suicide. After he dies, he is met by two angels (Rasim Öztekin and Arda Kural), who, as a punishment, show Tolga scenes from how his life would have been in the future if he had not committed suicide.

Cast
 Hayrettin Karaoğuz as Tolga
 Hande Subaşı as Ebru
 Rasim Öztekin as Canal
 Arda Kural as Felek
 Neco as Timur
 Işın Karaca as Filiz
 Murat Serezli as Salim
 Bektaş Erdoğan as Metin
 Hümeyra Aydoğdu as Berna
 Yeşim Dalgıçer as Rüya

Release

Reception

Box office
The movie has made a total gross of $296,103.

References

External links
 Gelecekten Bir Gün official website (Turkish)
 Gelecekten Bir Gün at Beyazperde (Turkish)
 
 

2010 films
2010 comedy films
Films about suicide
Films set in Turkey
2010s fantasy comedy films
Turkish fantasy comedy films
2010s Turkish-language films